C11 is an untarred highway in southern Namibia. It starts along the C17 road,  from Keetmanshoop and finishes  later when it reaches the B3 road,  from Karasburg.

References

Roads in Namibia
ǁKaras Region